Kirsten Pearce (born 10 April 1991) is a New Zealand field hockey player who has represented her country.

Personal life
Pearce was born in Wynberg, Cape Town, South Africa before moving to New Zealand. She grew up on Auckland's North Shore in New Zealand, before shifting with her family to Australia at a young age. She has dual New Zealand and Australian citizenship.

Playing career
Pearce was an Australian under-21 international before joining the New Zealand side in 2015.

She competed in the 2014–15 Women's FIH Hockey World League Semifinals and Final and represented New Zealand at the 2016 Summer Olympics.

References

External links
 
 
 

New Zealand female field hockey players
Field hockey players at the 2016 Summer Olympics
Olympic field hockey players of New Zealand
1991 births
Living people
South African emigrants to New Zealand
New Zealand expatriate sportspeople in Australia
Sportspeople from Cape Town
21st-century New Zealand women
2023 FIH Indoor Hockey World Cup players